This is a list of British women physicians.

A
 Heather Ashton (1929–2019), physician and psychopharmacologist.

B
 Josephine Barnes (1912–1999), obstetrician and gynaecologist, first female president of the British Medical Association.
 Emily Blackwell (1826–1910), third woman to earn a medical degree in the United States (born Bristol).
 Margaret Bromhall (1890–1967), English radiotherapist. 
 Edith Mary Brown (1864–1956), founded the first medical training facility for women in Asia.

C
 Sheila Cassidy (born 1937), known for her work in the hospice movement and human rights campaigning.
 Maud Chadburn
 Hilda Clark (doctor)
 Rachel Clarke
 Vicky Clement-Jones
 Harriet Clisby

D
 Sally Davies (doctor)

G
 Elizabeth Garrett Anderson (1836–1917), co-founder of London School of Medicine for Women.
 Louisa Garrett Anderson

H
 Gillian Hanson
 Mary Hemingway Rees
 Gertrude Herzfeld

J
 Sophia Jex-Blake
 Caroline Johnson

K
 Anna Kingsford
 Judith Kingston

L
 Barrie Lambert
 Janet Lane-Claypon
 Elizabeth Lepper

M
 Isabella Macdonald Macdonald
 Joan Malleson
 Louisa Martindale
 Florence Miller
 Jessie Murray
 Christine Murrell

P
 Innes Hope Pearse

S
 Ella Campbell Scarlett
 Mary Scharlieb
 Edith Shove
 Miriam Stoppard
 Mary Sturge

V
 Alice Vickery

W
 Marjory Warren
 Edith Whetnall
 Ethel Williams (physician)
 Jane Wilson-Howarth
 Helena Rosa Wright

See also
 List of first female physicians by country
 List of physicians
 Women in medicine

References

Lists of women
British women medical doctors
Lists of women by occupation and nationality